There are at least five historical people of Unterwalden called Arnold Winkelried. 
the first recorded man with this name is sometimes identified with Arnold von Winkelried of Swiss patriotic legend
Arnold Winkelried (mercenary leader) (died 1522)